Love Me Back:

 Love Me Back (album), by Jazmine Sullivan 
 "Love Me Back" (Can Bonomo song)
 "Love Me Back" (Koda Kumi song)